Shriya Jha is an Indian film and television actress who has acted in Telugu, Odia and Bengali films. She is the daughter of actress Amardeep Jha. She has played the lead character in Rajshri Productions' Hindi serial Jhilmil Sitaaron Ka Angan Hoga on Sahara One. She completed her schooling from GNFC School, Mussoorie. She was lately seen as Sweety in Nimki Mukhiya on Star Bharat and in Ishaaron Ishaaron Mein on Sony Entertainment Television. Currently she is seen as Barkha Shergill in Ziddi Dil Maane Na on Sony Sab.

Filmography

Telugu films
 Gita (2008 film)

Bengali films
 Tomar Jonyo (2008)
 Olot Palot (2009 film)

Odia films
 Luchakali(2012)
 Ama Bhitare Kichi Achi
 Shatru Sanghar(2009)

TV shows 
Jhilmil Sitaaron Ka Aangan Hoga as Angana Raichand (Lead role)
Do Dil Bandhe Ek Dori Se as Madhavi (Antagonist)
 Uttaran as Chameli (Antagonist)
Nimki Mukhiya as Sweety, Nimki's sister-in-law and Rituraj's wife (Protagonist) 2018-2019
 Nimki Vidhayak as Sweety Abhimanyu Rai (2019-2020)
 Ishaaron Ishaaron Mein as Mohana Banerjee (2020)
 Ziddi Dil Maane Na as Barkha Shergill (2021-2022)

References

Actresses in Telugu cinema
Indian film actresses
Living people
Actresses from Delhi
Actresses in Odia cinema
21st-century Indian actresses
1992 births